The 2010 United States Senate elections in Illinois took place on November 2, 2010.  There were two ballot items for the same seat: a general election, to fill the Class 3 seat beginning with the 112th United States Congress beginning on January 3, 2011, and a special election, to fill that seat for the final weeks of the 111th Congress. Democrat Roland Burris, who was appointed to fill the vacancy created by Barack Obama's election to the presidency, did not seek a full term.

The elections took place alongside 33 other elections to the United States Senate in other states, as well as elections to the United States House of Representatives and various state and local elections in Illinois and other states. The registered party primaries for the full term took place on February 2, 2010, the earliest state primary elections: Republicans nominated U.S. Representative Mark Kirk, Democrats nominated State Treasurer Alexi Giannoulias, and the Green Party nominated journalist LeAlan Jones. The Constitution Party and Libertarian Party submitted signatures to be on the ballot but were challenged; the result of the ensuing hearings was the Constitution Party's candidate being denied placement on the ballot but the Libertarian Party's candidate Michael Labno given ballot access.

On August 2, the United States District Court for the Northern District of Illinois ruled that the candidates appearing on the ballot for the replacement election would be the ones of the regular election, and that the special election would appear after the general election on the ballot. Incumbent Senator Roland Burris would not appear on either ballot item. Kirk won with 48% of the vote compared to Giannoulias's 46.4%, or a winning margin of 1.6%, thus making this election the closest race of the 2010 Senate election cycle.

Election information
The primaries and general elections of both the special election and regularly scheduled election coincided with those for House and those for state offices.

Background

Vacancy 
Barack Obama, the former United States Senator holding this seat, was elected President of the United States on November 4, 2008, and subsequently resigned from the Senate on November 16, 2008.  Illinois law provides for the Governor of Illinois to appoint replacements for Senate vacancies.

Burris's appointment 
On December 9, 2008, the FBI arrested Governor Rod Blagojevich (D) on various corruption charges, most notably allegations that he attempted to sell the appointment to the vacant U.S. Senate seat. On December 31, 2008, Blagojevich nevertheless appointed former Illinois Attorney General Roland Burris to fill the vacancy.  After initially seeking to exclude Burris, Senate Democrats relented, and Burris was seated on January 15, 2009.

Burris later declined to run for re-election.

Turnout

For the state-run primary elections (Democratic, Republican, and Green), turnout was 21.74%, with 1,652,202 votes cast.

For the general election, the special election saw turnout of 47.24%, with 3,545,984 votes cast and the regularly-scheduled election saw turnout of 49.35% with 3,704,473 votes cast.

Democratic primary

Candidates 
 Alexi Giannoulias, Illinois Treasurer
 David H. Hoffman, Chicago inspector general
 Cheryle Jackson, President of the Chicago Urban League
 Robert Marshall, doctor
 Jacob Meister, attorney. Meister dropped out two days before the election and endorsed Giannoulias, but his name remained on the ballot.

Campaign 

Incumbent Senator Roland Burris did not run for a full term in 2010.  Burris suffered from poor approval ratings and was investigated by the Sangamon County, Illinois State's Attorney for perjury. Although no criminal charges were filed against him, Burris faced an investigation by the Senate Ethics Committee.

Jacob Meister withdrew from campaigning and declared his support for Alexi Giannoulias on January 31, two days before the February 2 election.

Finances

Polling

Results

Republican primary

Candidates 
 John Arrington, former Harvey alderman
 Patrick Hughes, Chairman of Sensible Taxpayers Opposed to Increased Taxes
 Mark Kirk, U.S. Representative for Illinois's 10th district
 Donald Lowery, former Pope County Judge
 Andy Martin, perennial candidate
 Kathleen Thomas, professor

Finances

Polling

Results

Green primary

Candidates 
 LeAlan Jones, broadcaster, football coach, and lecturer

Results

General elections

Candidates 
 Alexi Giannoulias, Illinois Treasurer (Democratic)
 Mark Kirk, U.S. Representative (Republican)
 LeAlan Jones, broadcaster, football coach, and lecturer (Green)
 Michael Labno, electrical project construction manager (Libertarian) (campaign site, PVS)
 Corey Dabney (write-in)
 Robert Zadek (write-in) broker (campaign site)
 Will Boyd (write-in), Greenville City Councilman, pastor and former college dean 
 Lowell Martin Seida (Write-in), Westchester UIC Dragon Boat coach, salvage diver, computerist
(campaign site)

Campaign 
A self-described "fiscal conservative and social moderate," Republican nominee Mark Kirk based his campaign on reform and compared the race to Republican Scott Brown's election to the Senate in February 2010. In addition, Kirk immediately criticized his Democratic opponent for his management of Bright Start, an Illinois 529 college savings program and his work at Broadway Bank.  Immediately after the primary, the National Republican Senatorial Committee aired a web ad comparing Giannoulias to the fictional character Tony Soprano. Politifact ranked Kirk's references to the mob as "Half True". Republican U.S. Senator Scott Brown campaigned for Kirk in Illinois. Kimberly Vertolli, Kirk's ex-wife, signed on as an advisor to Mark Kirk's campaign, but didn't support his more conservative platform.

On February 4, 2010, Democrat Alexi Giannoulias revealed his campaign strategy, saying "come November, Congressman, your days as a Washington insider are over."  On July 19, 2010, Giannoulias announced that he had raised $900,000 in the quarter that ended June 30, compared to $2.3 million raised by Kirk. The Giannoulias campaign also announced that President Obama was scheduled to attend an August 5 fundraiser for his candidate in Chicago.

Kirk and Giannoulias disagreed mostly on fiscal and foreign policy. Kirk voted against Obama's Stimulus package and the Patient Protection and Affordable Care Act. As a Congressman, Kirk originally voted for Cap and trade but during the primary campaign announced that if elected a Senator he would vote against it. Giannoulias strongly supported the Patient Protection and Affordable Care Act and Obama's stimulus. Kirk opposed the building of the Park 51 Islamic center near Ground Zero of New York City, while Giannoulias stated that "Americans must stand up for freedom of religion even when it's difficult."

Libertarian nominee Micahel Labno was added to the ballot by the Illinois State Board of Elections after gaining ballot access by means of citizen petition. Labno, an electrical project construction manager and recruiter for Private Security Union Local 21 ran on a platform of downsizing or cutting some Federal agencies and reducing taxes and government regulations. He also supported allowing citizens to opt out of Social Security. Labno is pro-life and supports 2nd Amendment rights.  In August 2010, Democratic candidate Alexi Giannoulias declared Labno a legitimate challenge from the right for Mark Kirk. Labno responded on his Facebook fan page, saying "This is very true Alexi, and you should be afraid too."
Labno attended the September 18, 2010 Right Nation rally in Hoffman Estates, Illinois headlined by conservative media figure Glenn Beck. While greeting attendees Labno noted that Republican candidate Kirk did not attend. On August 27 the Illinois Board of Elections approved the Libertarian Party's petition to include its candidates on the ballot.

Predictions

Debates 
Kirk and Giannoulias debates (other candidates were not invited):
 October 10: Nationwide audience on Meet the Press on NBC.
 October 19: Sponsored by League of Women Voters on ABC News.
Jones and Labno debate:
 Hosted by WBEZ held in Chicago.

Polling

Fundraising

Results

References

External links 
 Illinois State Board of Elections
 Official candidate list
 Illinois House of Representatives elections, 2010 at Ballotpedia
 U.S. Congress candidates for Illinois at Project Vote Smart
 Illinois U.S. Senate from OurCampaigns.com
 Campaign contributions from Open Secrets
 2010 Illinois Senate General Election: All Head-to-Head Matchups graph of multiple polls from Pollster.com
 Election 2010: Illinois Senate from Rasmussen Reports
 Illinois Senate – Giannoulias vs. Kirk from Real Clear Politics
 2010 Illinois Senate Race from CQ Politics
 Race profile from The New York Times
 Race for U.S. Senate from the Chicago Tribune
Debates and forums
 Democratic (January 12) and Republican (January 14, 2010) Primary Debates videos from sponsor ABC7 Chicago
 Candidate forum, Chicago Tonight. October 27, 2010
Official campaign sites (Archived)
 Will Boyd for U.S. Senate
 Alton Franklin for U.S. Senator
 Alexi Giannoulias for Illinois Democratic nominee
 David Hoffman for U.S. Senate
 LeAlan M. Jones for U.S. Senate Green Party nominee
 Mark Kirk for U.S Senate Republican nominee
 Michael Labno for U.S. Senate Libertarian Party nominee
 Jacob Meister for U.S. Senate
 Kathleen Thomas for U.S. Senate
 Robert Zadek for U.S. Senate Independent Conservative – Write-In Candidate

2010 Illinois elections
Illinois
2010
Illinois 2010
Illinois Senate
United States Senate 2010